Proposition 19 may refer to a California ballot initiative:
2020 California Proposition 19, a successful property tax change
2010 California Proposition 19, a failed attempt at marijuana legalization
1972 California Proposition 19, a failed attempt at marijuana legalization